The Denver Gold was a franchise in the United States Football League, an attempt to establish a second major professional football league in the United States, playing a springtime season, from 1983 to 1985. The Gold played their home games at Mile High Stadium in Denver, Colorado; co-tenants in the spring with the Triple-A Denver Zephyrs baseball team (Denver Bears prior to 1984).

History

Holding fast to the USFL's original blueprint
When the USFL first organized, league officials identified Denver as a critical market. However, they had a difficult time finding an owner. Ultimately, the league's first operations chief, John Ralston, got in touch with local real estate magnate Ron Blanding, an old friend from his days as head coach of the National Football League's Denver Broncos. After some pleading, Blanding agreed to sign on.

Blanding was easily the poorest owner in the league. He held fast to USFL founder David Dixon's original blueprint for the league, keeping tight controls on expenses (including player salaries) while heavily marketing the team in the Rockies.

The Gold's original coach was Red Miller, who led the Broncos to their first-ever Super Bowl and had known Blanding for several years. Miller was still a very popular figure in the area; fans were still smarting at how the Broncos fired him after the 1980 season. However, Miller bristled at Blanding's bargain-basement approach to running the team. The players used rented cars from Rent-a-Wreck, some of which were in rather poor condition. They had to rely on bare-bones meals, traveled to training camp in old school buses, and only had 100 uniforms for the 120 men they invited to camp. Blanding also balked at signing any of the Gold's first seven picks in the 1983 draft. It got to the point that an irate Miller once threatened to quit unless Blanding decided to "act like a fucking owner of a professional football team."

1983 season
The Gold attempted to utilize some of the goodwill established by the more established Broncos by involving former Broncos players and coaches in the Gold organization for the Gold's inaugural 1983 season. Miller stocked his Gold roster with a number of former Broncos players. He also tapped his former starting quarterback with the Broncos, Craig Morton, as his offensive coordinator. Morton became head coach after Blanding fired Miller in the middle of the 1983 season. Despite one of the toughest defenses in the league, a weak offense kept the Gold out of the playoffs in 1983. Blanding, however, was more satisfied with the fact that he actually turned a profit. He was also happy that the Gold led the league in attendance, with almost 42,000 fans per game.

1983 schedule and results

1984 season

1984 season recap
After finishing the 1983 season making a small profit, the Gold went into the 1984 campaign with a bare-bones payroll.  They did not sign any significant free agents or college draft picks and traded away two of their three starting linebackers during training camp. First they dealt RLB Kyle Whittingham (84 tackles, 3 fumble recoveries and 2 interceptions) in a package deal to New Jersey and then traded popular All-USFL LB Putt Choate, who had 178 tackles the previous year to the expansion San Antonio Gunslingers.

With one of the league's lowest payrolls going into the 1984 season, the Gold shot out of the gate to a surprising 7-1 record and were tied atop the USFL along with the powerful Philadelphia Stars and Birmingham Stallions after 8 weeks.

However, the turning point of the season was a 20-18 loss at the Louisiana Superdome to the New Orleans Breakers on April 22.  With starting QB Craig Penrose not dressed, the Gold dropped what would be the first of five consecutive losses.  Their early success was attributed to an opportunistic offense and a bend-but-don't break defense that seemed to overcome their personnel issues at linebacker.

During this time, Blanding put the Gold on the market. Unwilling to join his fellow owners in reckless spending, Blanding sold the team to auto dealer Doug Spedding for $10 million in April 1984.  By some accounts, Blanding was the only USFL owner who got a net positive return on his investment. Spedding shared Blanding's frugal approach to running the team; if anything, he was even more cost-conscious than Blanding. He ran the Gold out of one of his dealerships. Despite being rather eccentric (according to Morton and Blanding, he was notorious for opening players' mail), years later many former Gold players praised Spedding for holding fast to the original USFL model.

Over the second half of the season, Morton had a QB shuffle that saw him use four different starters in Penrose, Bob Gagliano, Fred Mortensen and rookie Ken Hobart at various points over the last nine games.  The Gold went 2–7 down the stretch and finished out of the playoffs. Acquired from Jacksonville in May, Hobart made his first pro start on June 8, a two-point loss to eventual champion Philadelphia, decided by a late field goal.

The offense ranked a respectable eleventh in passing and fourteenth in rushing among the eighteen USFL teams in 1984.  Running back Harry Sydney was the main offensive weapon rushing for 961 yards and ten touchdowns to lead the Gold. Quarterback Craig Penrose tossed twelve TD's and was picked fourteen times over eleven starts in fourteen appearances.

The Gold offense was centered around a short passing game featuring running backs Sydney and  Vincent White making 44 and 37 receptions respectively to finish 1-2 in team receiving.  WR Leonard Harris was the most effective wideout for the Gold catching just 35 passes but had whopping 18.8 average per catch.  Former New Jersey General TE Victor Hicks caught 31 passes to lead the tight ends.

The most stable and effective part of the Gold offense in 1984 was the offensive line.  Tackles Steve Rogers and Ray Wagner along with guards George Yarno and Greg Feasel and centre Tom Davis did a solid job opening holes and creating pass protection most of the season.

The defensive unit struggled off and on throughout the season and actually shifted from a 3-4 set to a 4-3 defense late in the year to compensate for their lack of quality linebackers.

To address some of their needs, the Gold acquired DE Dennis Edwards (who had 6 sacks in 1983), from the Los Angeles Express and former Dallas Cowboy DE Bruce Thornton from the Chicago Blitz in mid-March.  Thornton would contribute 6 sacks for the Gold in his limited playing time over the last 13 games.

In June, the Gold also acquired another former Dallas Cowboys alum in LB Bruce Huther from the 3-15 Pittsburgh Maulers.  Huther was the starting middle linebacker over the last few games.

With the departure of Choate and Whittington in training camp, the Gold were not able to convert linebackers John Bungartz, Greg Gerken and Kelvin Newton into effective everyday starters.  By the end of the season Bungartz and Gerken were relegated mostly to special teams and Newton was released before the season finale.

The unit did, however, have a relatively strong pass rush with DE Dave Stalls (12.5 sacks), DE Calvin Turner (10 sacks) and Thornton (6 sacks) having solid seasons.

The Gold secondary was the most stable part of the defensive unit with CB David Martin being named to the All-USFL team as a punt returner and a cornerback on The Sporting News All-USFL team in 1984.  Martin led the USFL in punt returns with a 13.6 per return average on 22 run-backs, scoring 1 TD.

The secondary had four players record more the 100 tackles on the season in Martin, SS David Dumars, FS Steve Trimble and FS Tom Sullivan - an indication of the softness at the linebacker position.

In mid-season, the Gold special teams took a hit when punter Steve Gortz was injured in a game on April 14 in Pittsburgh.  Instead of signing a replacement for Gortz, place kicker Brian Speelman took over the punting duties and served in a dual role for the remainder of the season.

Morton was widely seen as a players coach and it was reported that Spedding expected the Gold to make the playoffs in order for Morton to keep his job. However, unable to overcome the 2-7 slide, the team finished 9-9, one game out of the playoffs.

1984 schedule and results

1984 front office and coaching staff

1984 opening day roster

1984 end-of-season roster

1984 game summaries

Week 1: at Los Angeles Express

The Gold began their second season on the road against their Pacific Division foe, the Los Angeles Express at the fabled Los Angeles Coliseum which was undergoing a facelift in parts of the stadium in advance of the 1984 Summer Olympic Games scheduled for July 1984.

With under six minutes left in a 10-10 game, Gold QB Craig Penrose found WR Elmer Bailey in the end zone for a 6-yard scoring play to give Denver a late 17-10 lead.  On the next series, Denver safety Darryl Hemphill picked off Express QB Tom Ramsey and returned it 42-yards for the major to quickly seal a 27-10 victory for the Gold.

The Express got on the board first when rookie K Tony Zendejas hit a 36-yard field goal 9:08 into the contest to give the host club a 3-0 lead after the first quarter.

Early in the second, Gold FB Bo Matthews plunged in from 1-yard out to give the Gold a 7-3 just 2:15 into the period.  The Express, however, responded when starting QB Tom Ramsey threw a 12-yard scoring pass to WR Jo Jo Townsell in the back of the end zone to give Los Angeles a 10-7 lead with 4:04 left in the quarter.

However, the Gold quickly drove into Express territory on the last drive of the first half and setup K Brian Speelman for a 43-yard field goal with just 0:03 remaining in the half.

After a scoreless third quarter, the Gold blew the game wide open with under six minutes to go in the contest.

The Gold (1-0) travel to Tulsa to take on the Oklahoma Outlaws (1-0) next Saturday (Mar.3rd) while the Express (0-1) host the Birmingham Stallions (0-1) next Sunday (Mar. 4).

Scoring Summary:

Q1 – LAX – 5:52 – Tony Zendejas 42-yard FG (3-0 LAX)
Q2 – DEN – 14:45 – Bo Matthews 1-yard run (Speelman kick) (7–3 DEN)
Q2 - LAX - 4:04 - Jo Jo Townsell 12-yard TD pass from Tom Ramsey (Zendejas kick) (10-7 LAX)
Q2 – DEN – 0:53 – Brian Speelman 43-yard FG (10–10)
Q4 – DEN – 5:50 – Elmer Bailey 6-yard TD pass from Craig Penrose (Speelman kick) (17–10 DEN)
Q4 – DEN – 4:39 – Darryl Hemphill 42-yard interception return (Speelman kick) (24–10 DEN)
Q4 – DEN – 2:01 – Brian Speelman 46-yard FG (27-10 DEN)

Individual Statistics:

Rushing

DEN - Sydney 14-62, Matthews, Bo 10-13-1, Williams, K. 1-9, White 1-2
LAX - Nelson 10-49, Harrington 7-28, Ramsey 1-9, Allen 2-0, Ellis 1-0

Passing

DEN - Penrose 16-22-166-1-1, Sydney 0-1-0-0-0
LAX - Ramsey 24-33-147-1-3, Partridge 1-1-(-3)-0-0

Receiving
DEN - Bailey 3-41-1, Harris 3-34, Sydney 3-27, Niziolek 2-15, Hicks 2-10, Williams 1-23, Murray 1-10, Matthews, Bo 1-6
LAX - Hersey 5-37, Ellis 5-22, Moore 3-28, Sherrod 3-12, Nelson 3-11, Townsell 2-20, Harrington 2-12, Allen 1-5, Boddie 1-(-3)

Week 2: at Oklahoma Outlaws

The Gold continued their two-game road trip to start the season in Tulsa, OK against the expansion Oklahoma Outlaws.  Led by former Tampa Bay Buccaneers star QB Doug Williams, the Outlaws won their opener the previous week, 7-3 over the Pittsburgh Maulers.

After a scoreless first quarter, Oklahoma jumped out to a 7-0 lead when former Pittsburgh Steeler FB Sidney Thornton scored on a 7-yard scoring pass from QB Doug Williams with 0:28 left in the first half.

The Gold, however, struck quick again late in the third quarter when RB Vincent White scored on a one-yard plunge with 4:47 left in the third quarter.  Just 2:25 later, RB Harry Sydney scored on a 13-yard scoring romp after the Gold recovered a botched snap by Outlaws' P Bob Boris.

In the fourth, the Outlaws tied the contest when Williams scored on a 1-yard keeper 1:24 into the quarter to tie the score at 14-14.

After the Outlaws turned over the ball on the opening kickoff in Overtime, Gold K Brian Speelman hit a-21-yard field goal just 0:31 into the extra period to lift the Gold to a 17-14 victory.  The win lifted the Gold to a 2-0 record to start the 1984 USFL season and early possession of first place in the Pacific Division.

Scoring Summary:

Q2 – OKL – 0:28 – Sidney Thornton 7-yard TD pass from Doug Williams (Crum kick) (7-0 OKL)
Q3 – DEN – 4:47 – Vincent White 1-yard run (Speelman kick) (7–7)
Q3 - DEN - 2:22 - Harry Sydney 13-yard run (Speelman kick) (14-7 DEN)
Q4 – OKL – 13:36 – Doug Williams 1-yard run (Crum kick) (14–14)
OT – DEN – 0:31 – Brian Speelman 21-yard FG (17-10 DEN)

Individual Statistics:

Rushing

DEN - Sydney 14-57-1, White 9-19-1, Matthews, Bo 5-13, Murray 1-8
OKL - Thornton 14-49, D. Williams 4-22-1, James 8-14, Ragsdale 2-(1), Boris 2-(-29)

Passing

DEN - Penrose 14-23-164-0-1
OKL - Williams 24-45-259-1-0

Receiving

DEN - Hicks 3-74, Harris 3-28, White 3-21, Sydney 3-10, K Williams 1-19, Bailey 1-12
OKL - Thornton 6-34-1, Crane 5-48, Turner 4-55, James 4-20, Wheeler 2-57, Blair 1-29, Hughes 1-10, Ragsdale 1-6

1985 season

1985 season recap
In hopes of getting into the playoffs, Spedding hired Houston Gamblers offensive coordinator Mouse Davis for the 1985 season. Rumors had actually abounded that Davis was coming to Denver for much of the latter part of the 1984 season. Davis was the chief advocate of the Run & Shoot offense in the USFL and had implemented the system in Houston that helped make Jim Kelly a superstar.

Davis brought in former Chicago Blitz QB Vince Evans.  Evans split time with Bob Gagliano, a 4th string QB under Morton.  Neither QB was great running the offense, but good schemes by Davis and talent at the other spots shot the Gold up to 4th in the league in offense.

Unfortunately, just after Davis took over, the USFL announced that it would switch to a fall schedule for the 1986 season. Spedding was one of two owners (the other being Tampa Bay Bandits owner John F. Bassett) to vote to stay on a spring schedule, knowing that the Gold could not even begin to go head-to-head with the Broncos. His guess proved right. While the Gold had been one of the USFL's attendance leaders, fans in the Denver area were not about to abandon the Broncos. Despite finally getting into the playoffs with an 11-7 record, the Gold's attendance crashed from over 20,000 to 14,400 fans per game.

As a result, despite finishing second in the Western Conference, they were forced to play on the road against the lower-seeded Memphis Showboats under pressure from ABC. The network, who had considerable influence over the USFL due to the structuring of the league's television contract, did not want the embarrassment of having a game played in a near-empty stadium. The Gold were shelled 48-7.

1985 schedule and results

1985 opening day roster

Demise of the franchise and the league

The Gold would have been in an impossible position even without their attendance figures falling through the floor after the USFL announced it would move to the fall. Staying at Mile High Stadium would have been a logistical nightmare, and no other stadium in the area was large enough or suitable enough for temporary use.

In hopes of finding a way out of a bad situation, Spedding announced in November that he planned to move the Gold to Portland, Oregon to take the place of the departed Portland Breakers. However, just three months later, Spedding sold the Gold's player contracts to the Jacksonville Bulls. Although the move was billed as a merger, Spedding retained the Gold's intellectual properties. He seriously considered joining Bassett's proposed spring football league before Bassett's failing health prevented that league from launching. Instead Spedding, Bassett, and the USFL as a whole were doomed by the ill-advised attempt to move the playing season to the fall in 1986 in direct competition with the more-established NFL.

The USFL's high-stakes anti-trust suit against the NFL ended in an award of only US$3.00 to the USFL. The jury cited the league's abandonment of Denver and several other major markets as one reason why it awarded the USFL only nominal damages. With no new funds to cover its high spending, the USFL cancelled its 1986 season and folded.

Single-season leaders
Rushing Yards: 1261 (1985), Bill Johnson

Receiving Yards: 1432 (1985), Leonard Harris

Passing Yards: 2695 (1985), Bob Gagliano

Season-by-season results

|-
|1983 || 7 || 11 || 0 || 3rd Pacific || --
|-
|1984 || 9 || 9 || 0 || 3rd WC Pacific || --
|-
|1985 || 11 || 7 || 0 || 7th WC || Lost Quarterfinal (Memphis)
|-
!Totals || 27 || 28 || 0
|colspan="2"| (including playoffs)

References

External links
 Remember the USFL
 oursportscentral.com - USFL - 1984 Denver Gold - team photo & roster

 
1982 establishments in Colorado
1985 disestablishments in Colorado